Mark Allen Webber (born July 19, 1980) is an American actor. He is known for his roles in the films Snow Day, Weapons, The Laramie Project, and Scott Pilgrim vs. the World.

Early life
Webber was born in Minneapolis, Minnesota, where he spent the first nine years of his life. His mother, Cheri Lynn Honkala, is a noted advocate for the homeless in Philadelphia, and was the vice-presidential nominee of the Green Party in the 2012 presidential election. 

In 1989, he and his single mother moved to Philadelphia, where they spent time homeless, living in cars and abandoned buildings, and struggling to survive during the harsh winters.

Career
Webber began his acting career in 1998. He favors "offbeat independent productions and challenging roles that involve intense characterization."

In March 2019, Webber was cast as Grey McConnell in the ABC crime drama series Stumptown which was written by Jason Richman. After the series was ordered, Webber was replaced and the role was recast with Jake Johnson.

Personal life
Webber was formerly in a relationship with actress Frankie Shaw, with whom he has a son. The end of their relationship inspired Webber to create his film The End of Love, which starred himself and his son and premiered at Sundance in January 2012. Webber and Shaw share joint custody of their son.

In September 2012, Webber began dating Australian actress Teresa Palmer after she contacted him via Twitter. They became engaged in August 2013, and married on December 21, 2013, in Mexico. They have four children: a son (born February 2014), a second son (born December 2016), a daughter (born April 2019), and a second daughter (born August 2021). As of 2013, they reside in the Beachwood Canyon community of Los Angeles. 

Webber and his mother are longtime outspoken advocates for the homeless. They have organized protest walks, helped educate voters, and volunteered to provide food and shelter to the urban poor in Philadelphia and elsewhere. Honkala ran for Sheriff of Philadelphia in 2011 with the Green Party on a "no evictions" platform.

Filmography

Directing credits
Explicit Ills (2008)
The End of Love (2012)
The Ever After (2014)
Flesh and Blood (2017)
The Place Of No Words (2019)

References

External links

 
 

1980 births
Living people
20th-century American male actors
21st-century American male actors
Male actors from Minneapolis
American male film actors
Film producers from Pennsylvania
American people of Cheyenne descent
American people of Finnish descent
American male screenwriters
American social activists
American male television actors
Homelessness activists
Homeless people
Male actors from Philadelphia
Film directors from Pennsylvania
Writers from Philadelphia
Screenwriters from Pennsylvania
Screenwriters from Minnesota
Film producers from Minnesota
Film directors from Minnesota